Cycling at the 2011 Island Games was held from 26 June–1 July 2011 at the Military Road, VentnorTown and Cheverton Farm.

Events

Medal table

Men

Women

References
Cycling at the 2011 Island Games

2011 Island Games
2011 in road cycling
2011 in cycle racing
2011
2011 in mountain biking